Saemaul, Saema'eul or "new village," may refer to:

 The New Community Movement or Saemaul Undong for rural development in South Korea in the 1970s
 Saemaeul-ho, a class of passenger train operated by Korail